Sudden unexplained nocturnal death syndrome may refer to:

Brugada syndrome, a genetic disorder in which the electrical activity within the heart is abnormal
Sudden arrhythmic death syndrome (SADS), a sudden unexpected death of adolescents and adults, mainly during sleep